Beta-(1-pyrazolyl)alanine synthase may refer to:
 Beta-pyrazolylalanine synthase, an enzyme
 Pyrazolylalanine synthase, an enzyme